Marston is a township municipality in Le Granit Regional County Municipality in the Estrie region in Quebec, Canada. A township municipality is all or part of the territory of a township (townships were originally only a land surveying feature) set up as a municipality.

It is named after Long Marston, North Yorkshire in England.

Demographics 

Population trend:

See also
Types of municipalities in Quebec

References

External links

Township municipalities in Quebec
Incorporated places in Estrie
Le Granit Regional County Municipality